The Community Business Development Corporation (CBDC) (French:  La Corporation de développement communautaire) is a federal and provincially funded not-for-profit organization. CBDCs assist in the creation of small businesses and in the expansion and modernization of existing small businesses by providing financial and technical services to entrepreneurs.

The organisation was founded in the 1970s and currently holds 41 offices throughout Atlantic Canada. The 41 offices are autonomous corporations but each work with their respective Provincial Association office. The Provincial Association offices are located in; Alberton, PEI; Elmsdale, NS; Mount Pearl, NL; and Bathurst, NB. These 4 offices work with the Atlantic Association of CBDCs to constantly improve the services offered by the CBDC network. The CBDCs are a member of the Community Futures Network of Canada.

Operating structure 

CBDCs operate under the guidance of a local Board of Directors.[2] The Board of Directors is representative of the area served by the CBDC, and all members of the board are community business leaders and volunteers. This organizational structure permits the CBDC to play a direct and active role in employment development within their jurisdiction. The Board of Directors is complemented by a professional staff, varying in size depending on the level of activity within the region served and resources made available to it by the Government of Canada. CBDCs act as a delivery agent for several governmental financing programs for small business. They have options available to help individuals establish a new business, expand an existing one, or to stabilize/modernize their current business.

Services 
CBDC offers financial assistance in the form of loans, loan guarantees and equity financing to existing and aspiring entrepreneurs. It puts a high priority to the advisory role of its mandate by focusing on providing business counselling and advice to its clients. CBDC provides entrepreneurship development and training to individuals and small business owners. It can also advocate on behalf of its clients to other lending establishments or regulatory agencies. Typically CBDC targets its services to entrepreneurs who require customized financing not available from traditional sources.

Some of the custom financing options offered include but are not limited to; CBDC Social Enterprise Loan, CBDC First-Time Entrepreneur Loan, CBDC General Business Loan, CBDC Youth Loan, CBDC Innovation Loan, Self Employment Assistance Program and the Consultant Advisory Services Program.

Jurisdiction
The CBDCs are dedicated to the development of small business and job creation and enhancement in rural Atlantic Canada.  CBDCs are subject to Treasury Board of Canada regulations.

References

Entrepreneurship
Business planning
Business opportunities
Small business